Norton is a market town in the Borough of Stockton-on-Tees, County Durham, England.

It stands on higher ground to the south, further away from the River Tees than Stockton town centre. They are small areas west of the area called Roseworth and Ragworth. Billingham Beck is to the area's east, the beck flows south-east to join the river. Wolviston and Wynyard are the nearest places to the north. They are three wards with the area's name. Combined the two former 2011 wards had a population of 20,829.

The area's centre dates back to at least the Anglo-Saxon period. It was the centre of an ancient parish that once included the chapelry of Stockton, which became its own ancient parish in 1713 which was three years after Stockton was granted a market charter. It became a part of Teesside County Borough in 1968, which was abolished in 1974, it has not been parished since.

History
In 1982, the chance discovery of human bones by school children playing on a rope swing near the Mill Lane area of the town, led to the unearthing of an Anglo-Saxon pagan cemetery. Excavations in 1984 revealed 120 burials (117 inhumations and 3 cremations) in graves that contained assorted personal items such as spears, belt buckles and brooches. The remains and objects collected suggest the site was dated to around AD 540–610.

To the south end of High Street, the Victoria Jubilee Memorial Cross stands where the market place was once situated. The red sandstone Anglian style cross commemorates Queen Victoria's Diamond Jubilee in 1897. Further along, and on the opposite side of the High Street are the Fox almshouses, also founded in 1897 at the bequest of local brewer John Henry Fox.

Geography

At the north end of Norton centre there is a large village green with a duckpond, surrounded by mostly Georgian houses and cottages. The ancient parish church of St. Mary the Virgin stands on the west side of the village Green.

Norton's wide and tree-lined High Street had a number of shops, hairdressers, boutiques, cafés, a library, photographic studio and a traditional fish & chips shop, as well as a mixture of 18th century and 19th century townhouses, cottages and modern apartments. Away from the village lie the housing estates of Albany, Glebe, Crooksbarn and Norton Grange (originally Blue Hall).

St Mary's Church
St Mary the Virgin, the ancient parish church that stands on the village green, is the only cruciform Anglo-Saxon church in northern England. Its crossing tower with eight triangular head windows has a battlemented top of later date, and there is a 14th-century effigy of a knight in chainmail. Residing under the church floor there is claimed to be an escape tunnel used by the Saxons and priests when in danger, though it is more probably a drainage culvert. The tunnel leads under the church floor and Norton Green, eventually surfacing in the Albany housing estate. The church floor was recently renovated and Saxon remains and artefacts were discovered in the tunnel entrance. St Mary's was until the Reformation a Catholic Church – which is true of all English churches pre-dating the Reformation.

The grave of John Walker, the inventor of friction matches, is located in the churchyard.

Norton's Catholic population now worship at St Joseph's in Darlington Lane. The church opened in 1933 and is part of the St Hilda Partnership within the Hexham and Newcastle Diocese.

Red House School
Located in the town is Red House School, an independent school established in 1929. Adjacent to St. Mary's Church is Red House Nursery & Infant School, which combines state of the art modern buildings with classrooms in the former Old Vicarage. On the opposite side of the village green resides Red House Preparatory and Main School. In May 2012, the school announced its intention to relocate to nearby Wynyard Park stating that it had outgrown its existing site in Norton. This, however, did not occur as the school decided to improve the existing site.

Public houses, cafés and restaurants

Norton is home to several pubs: Norton Tavern, The Moline Cross (known as Norton Cricket Club by locals), The Centenary, The Unicorn (known as The Top House by locals), The George and Dragon, The Highland Laddie, The Malleable Social Club, Connections, Red Lion, Norton Working Men's Club (aka The Village Club), The Head of Steam, Hydes Bar, Alitheos and Canteen and Cocktails. The village also has several restaurants and cafés including Scrann, Levan, Cafe Maison, The Norton Cafe, The Open Jar, Jolsha, Options, 12 Harland Place, Cafe Lilli, Cafe Maison and Bahn Mi.

Sport
The Norton (Teesside) Sports Complex is situated on Station Road and dates back to 1847 when it was the home of Norton Cricket Club. At the Club's Centenary Dinner in 1947, the members decided to buy the ground (and a further twelve acres surrounding it) with a view to developing it into one of the finest sports complexes in the north of England. During the past few decades further land was acquired and now as well as being home to Norton Cricket Club (which play in the NYSD cricket premier league), it provides facilities for a number of other sports, including: squash, tennis, hockey, bowls, five-a-side football, archery and boxfit.

The complex is also home to the Billingham Synthonia Football Club and is now again home to Norton & Stockton Ancients Football Club, reinstated in 2019 having folded 3 years previously in 2016.

Notable events
6 August 1856, John Warner and Sons cast the first bell for Big Ben, but it cracked beyond repair while being tested at Westminster. Another bell was later recast at the Whitechapel Bell Foundry in London.

14 July 1977, Queen Elizabeth II passed through Norton by car, in front of spectators during her Silver Jubilee royal visit to the region.

11 November 2006, Dragon's Den businessman Duncan Bannatyne (who owned a house on the High Street at the time, later moving to nearby Wynyard Park) was married at St Mary's Church in Norton. Celebrities at the ceremony included Anna Ryder Richardson, Cherie Lunghi, Gary McCausland, Dragons' Den presenter Evan Davis and fellow Dragons Theo Paphitis, Richard Farleigh, Simon Woodroffe and Deborah Meaden

Image gallery

Notable people from Norton
Geoff Deehan – television and film producer
Thomas Jefferson Hogg – barrister and writer
Stevie Lynn – professional wrestler
Christopher Middleton – navigator
Gary Pallister – professional footballer with Middlesbrough, Manchester United, and England
Franc Roddam – film director
Dean Stobbart – creator of the YouTube football cartoon channel 442oons
Rear-Admiral Polycarpus Taylor
David Townsend – Test cricketer
Peter Townsend – cricketer
John Walker (1781–1859) – inventor of the friction match, buried in the grounds of St Mary's Church, Norton

References

External links

Areas of Stockton-on-Tees